Víctor Guarderas Lavalle (5 June 1911 – 12 October 1975) was a Peruvian footballer who played as a defender. He competed in the men's tournament at the 1936 Summer Olympics.

References

External links
 

1911 births
1975 deaths
Association football defenders
Peruvian footballers
Peru international footballers
Olympic footballers of Peru
Footballers at the 1936 Summer Olympics
Club Alianza Lima footballers
Footballers from Lima